Jerry Kirk (born February 21, 1938) is a former American football player and coach.  He served as the head football coach at Emory & Henry College in Emory, Virginia in 1978, compiling a record of 2–7.

Head coaching record

References

1938 births
Living people
Clemson Tigers football coaches
East Tennessee State Buccaneers football players
Emory and Henry Wasps athletic directors
Emory and Henry Wasps football coaches
Ferrum Panthers football coaches
NC State Wolfpack football coaches
New York Jets coaches
People from Harlan County, Kentucky
Players of American football from Kentucky